The hya RNA motif is a conserved RNA structure that was discovered by bioinformatics.
hya motif RNAs are found in Actinomycetota.

hya motif RNAs likely function as cis-regulatory elements, in view of their positions upstream of protein-coding genes.
Indeed, the RNAs are upstream of multiple genes that encode non-homologous proteins.  If all examples of the RNA were upstream of homologous genes, there is the possibility that the RNAs were conserved in that position simply by inheritance.  The non-homology of the genes downstream of hya RNAs makes this scenario less likely.  The genes presumably regulated by hya RNAs are subunits of nickel-iron hydrogenase I.

References

Non-coding RNA